Cernuella aginnica is a species of small air-breathing land snail, a terrestrial pulmonate gastropod mollusk in the family Geomitridae.

Distribution

This species is known to occur in a number of countries and islands including:
 Great Britain
 The Netherlands
 France
 Italy
 Gibraltar
Spain

References

 Provoost, S.; Bonte, D. (Ed.) (2004). Animated dunes: a view of biodiversity at the Flemish coast [Levende duinen: een overzicht van de biodiversiteit aan de Vlaamse kust]. Mededelingen van het Instituut voor Natuurbehoud, 22. Instituut voor Natuurbehoud: Brussel, Belgium. ISBN 90-403-0205-7. 416, ill., appendices pp
 AnimalBase info at: 
 Abstract of paper confirming it as a British species:

External links
 Image of live individual at: 
 Good shell images at: 
 Locard, A. (1882). Prodrome de malacologie française. [I. Catalogue général des mollusques vivants de France. Mollusques terrestres, des eaux douces et des eaux saumâtres. vi + 462 pp. Lyon: Henri Georg.]

Geomitridae
Gastropods described in 1894